Acrosathe annulata  is a species of stiletto fly belonging to the family Therevidae.
It is a Palearctic species with a limited distribution in Europe

Description 

"Male entirely covered with silvery pubescence; female without any shining black frontal callus. Halteres whitish. Femora blackish in both sexes. Fourth posterior cell closed".

Biology
Habitat: Sand dunes and sand hills. They rest on hot bare sand among marram.

References

Therevidae
Insects described in 1805
Asilomorph flies of Europe